The Berg en Broeksche Verlaat is a canal lock in Rotterdam between the River Rotte and 2 peat bogs. It was built in 1866 and has Rijksmonument status.

Locks of the Netherlands
Rijksmonuments in Rotterdam